Aladdin Imad Shah was the second Sultan of Berar. He reigned between 1504 and 1529.

Family
In 1528, Aladdin Imad Shah married Khadija Sultana, the sister of Ismail Adil Shah. He had at least two children:
Darya Imad Shah, Sultan of Berar;
Rabiya Sultana, married Ibrahim Adil Shah I, Sultan of Bijapur;

References

Citations

Cited sources
  

Berar
Deccan sultanates
Imad Shahi dynasty
16th-century Indian Muslims
Sultans
16th-century Indian monarchs
Year of birth missing
Year of death missing